The 2016 United States House of Representatives elections in Texas were held on November 8, 2016, to elect the 36 U.S. representatives from the state of Texas, one from each of the state's 36 congressional districts. The elections coincided with the 2016 presidential election, as well as other elections to the House of Representatives, elections to the United States Senate and various state and local elections. The primaries were held on March 1.

Overview

District 1

The incumbent was Republican Louie Gohmert, who had represented the district since 2004. He was re-elected with 77% of the vote in 2014 and the district has a PVI of R+24. He faced a primary challenge from two competitors: Simon Winston, and Anthony Culler. Democrat Shirley McKellar, who lost to Gohmert in 2012 and 2014, ran for the district's seat again.

Primary results

General election

District 2

The incumbent was Republican Ted Poe, who had represented the district since 2004. He was re-elected with 68% of the vote in 2014 and the district has a PVI of R+16. He was unchallenged in the primary. Democrat Pat Bryan also ran for the district's seat.

Primary results

General election

District 3

The incumbent was Republican Sam Johnson, who had represented the district since 1991. He was re-elected with 82% of the vote in 2014 and the district has a PVI of R+17.

State Representative Scott Turner was considered a potential Republican candidate for whenever Johnson retires.

Democrats Adam Bell and Michael Filak ran in the Democratic primary. Bell won the nomination to oppose Johnson in the November 8 general election.

Primary results

General election

District 4

The incumbent, Republican John Ratcliffe, had represented the district since 2014. He was challenged in the Republican primary by Lou Gigliotti, and Ray Hall. Ratcliffe won the primary run-off with 66.59% of the vote. No Democrat filed to run.

Primary results

General election

District 5

The incumbent was Republican Jeb Hensarling, who has represented the district since 2012. He was re-elected with 85% of the vote in 2014 and the district has a PVI of R+17. He was unchallenged in the primary. No Democrat ran against him in the general election.

Primary results

General election

District 6

The incumbent was Republican Joe Barton, who had represented the district since 1985. He was re-elected in 2014 with 61% of the vote and the district has a PVI of R+11. His reelection margin increased to 68.7 percent in the 2016 primary.

Democrats Ruby Faye Woolridge, Jeffrey Roseman, and Don Jaquess all ran in the Democratic primary, which Ruby Faye Woolridge won with 68.65%.

Primary results

General election

District 7

The incumbent, Republican John Culberson, had represented the district since 2001. Culberson won the primary against James Lloyd and Maria Espinoza with 57% of the vote. Energy attorney and nominee for the seat in 2012 and 2014, James Cargas challenged Culberson in the general election.

Primary results

General election

District 8

The incumbent, Republican Kevin Brady, had represented the district since 1997. Brady was challenged again in the primary by Craig McMichael along with former State Representative Steve Toth and Andre Dean; Brady won with 53.4 percent of the vote and was unopposed in the November 8 general election.

Primary results

General election

District 9

The incumbent, Democrat Al Green, had represented the district since 2004. Green was unchallenged in the primary. Jeff Martin was the Republican candidate in the November 8 general election.

Primary results

General election

District 10

The incumbent, Republican Michael McCaul, had represented the district since 2005. Democrat Tawana Walter-Cadien, who was the democrat nominee in 2014, and Scot Gallaher ran in the Democratic primary. Tawana Walter-Cadien won the Democratic nomination with 51.7 percent of the vote.

Primary results

General election

District 11

The incumbent, Republican Mike Conaway, had represented the district since 2005. He was re-elected with 90% of the vote in 2014 and the district has a PVI of R+31. No Democrat ran for this district's seat, leaving Libertarian nominee Nicholas Landholt as the only opposition to Conway in the general election.

Primary results

General election

District 12

The incumbent, Republican Kay Granger, had represented the district since 1997. She was re-elected with 71% of the vote in 2014 and the district has a PVI of R+19. Democrat Bill Bradshaw also ran for the district's seat.

Primary results

General election

District 13

The incumbent, Republican Mac Thornberry, had represented the district since 1995. He was re-elected with 84% of the vote in 2014 and the district has a PVI of R+32. No Democrat ran for this district's seat, leaving only Libertarian and Green party opposition.

Primary results

General election

District 14

The incumbent, Republican Randy Weber, had represented the district since 2013. Keith Casey ran in the Republican primary; Weber won with 84.03% of the vote. Michael Cole was the Democratic nominee.

Primary results

General election

District 15

The incumbent was Democrat Rubén Hinojosa, who had represented the district since 1997. He was re-elected in 2014 with 54% of the vote and the district has a PVI of D+5. Hinojosa decided to retire this election cycle.

Six Democrats ran for the seat: law student Ruben Ramirez, former Hildago County Democratic Party Chairwoman Dolly Elizondo, attorney Vicente Gonzalez, Edinburg School Board Member Juan "Sonny" Palacios Jr., former Hidalgo County Commissioner Joel Quintanilla, and accountant Randy Sweeten. No candidate received 50% of the vote so the top two candidates, Vicente Gonzalez and Juan "Sonny" Palacios Jr., faced a run-off election, which Gonzalez won by the large margin of 66%–34%.

Former Rio Grande City Mayor Ruben Villarreal, Pastor Tim Westley, and Edinburg School Board Member Xavier Salinas ran for the Republican Party nomination. No candidate received 50% of the vote so the top two candidates, Tim Westley and Ruben Villarreal, faced a run-off election which Tim Westley won by 29 votes.

Primary results

Run-off results

General election

District 16

The incumbent, Democrat Beto O'Rourke, had represented the district since 2013. With 85.6 percent of the vote, he defeated Ben Mendoza in the Democratic primary election. No Republican ran for this seat, leaving only Libertarian and Green party opposition.

Primary results

General election

District 17

The incumbent, Republican Bill Flores, had represented the district since 2011. Flores won the primary with 72.45% of the vote against Ralph Patterson and Kaleb Sims. Democrat William Matta also ran in the general election.

Primary results

General election

District 18

The incumbent, Democrat Sheila Jackson Lee, had represented the district since 1995. Republicans Lori Bartley, Reggie Gonzales, Sharon Joy Fisher and Ava Pate ran in the primary election. No candidate achieved 50% of the vote, so Lori Bartley and Reggie Gonzales faced each other in the run-off, which Lori Bartley won by a margin of 58–42.

Primary results

Run-off results

General election

District 19

The incumbent is Republican Randy Neugebauer, who had represented the district since 2003. He was re-elected in 2014 with 77 percent of the vote and the district has a PVI of R+26.

Lubbock Mayor Glen Robertson announced in January 2015 that he was considering running against Neugebauer in the 2016 Republican primary. He cited unhappiness with what he said was Neugebauer's failure to bolster the cotton industry. In March, Robertson said that he would not run for Congress and instead run once more for mayor.

After Neugebauer decided to retire, Robertson entered the congressional race and withdrew from consideration for another term as mayor. None of the nine candidates obtained a majority in the Republican primary on March 1. Robertson led the field but had to face a run-off challenge against Jodey Arrington, a former official in the George W. Bush administration and a former vice chancellor at Texas Tech University in Lubbock. Arrington had trailed Robertson by fewer than one thousand votes in the first round, but he won the run-off. 

No Democrat faced Arrington in the general election, leaving only Libertarian and Green opposition.

Primary results

Run-off results

General election

District 20

The incumbent, Democrat Joaquín Castro, had represented the district since 2013. He was re-elected with 76% of the vote in 2014 and the district has a PVI of D+6. No Republican ran for this district's seat.

Primary results

General election

District 21

The incumbent is Republican Lamar S. Smith, who had represented the district since 1987. The district has a PVI of R+11.

Lamar S. Smith ran running for re-election and defeated Matt McCall, John Murphy and Todd Phelps in the Republican primary. Thomas Wakely and Tejas Vakil ran for the Democratic nomination, which Wakely won the Democratic nomination with 58.99% of the vote.

Primary results

General election

District 22

The incumbent, Republican Pete Olson, had represented the district since 2009. Democrats Mark Gibson, who lost in his party's primary in 2014, and A. R. Hassan ran for their party's nomination; Gibson won with this time with 76.16% of the vote.

Primary results

General election

District 23

The incumbent Republican, Will Hurd, had represented the district since 2015. He was elected in 2014, when he narrowly unseated the then Democratic incumbent Pete Gallego. The district has a PVI of R+3.

Gallego faced Hurd in a rematch in the November 8 general election, but narrowly lost again

Primary results

General election

District 24

The incumbent, Republican Kenny Marchant, had represented the district since 2013. He was re-elected with 65% of the vote in 2014 and the district has a PVI of R+13. Democrat Jan McDowell ran for the district's seat.

Primary results

General election

District 25

The incumbent, Republican Roger Williams, had represented the district since 2013. He was re-elected with 60% of the vote in 2014 and the district has a PVI of R+12. Democrat Kathi Thomas ran for the district's seat.

Primary results

General election

District 26

The incumbent, Republican Michael C. Burgess, had represented the district since 2003. He was challenged in the Republican primary by Joel A. Krause and Micah Beebe; Burgess won with 79.35% of the vote. Eric Mauck was the Democratic nominee.

Primary results

General election

District 27

The incumbent was Republican Blake Farenthold, who had represented the district since 2011. He was re-elected in 2014 with 64% of the vote and the district has a PVI of R+13.

John Harrington, president and founder of firearms retailer Shield Tactical, announced a primary challenge of Farenthold in May 2015.  The Texas Tribune reported that Harrington had the capacity to self-fund a race.  In August 2015 he announced that he was withdrawing because of lingering effects of a motorcycle crash.

Former State Representative Solomon Ortiz Jr. considered running for the Democratic nomination  Corpus Christi Mayor Nelda Martinez had considered running, but later announced that she would not. Raul Barrera won the Democratic nomination, but lost the general election.

Primary results

General election

District 28

The incumbent, Democrat Henry Cuellar, had represented the district since 2005. Cuellar was challenged by Republican-turned-Democrat William R. Hayward in the primary, in which Cuellar prevailed with 89.8 percent of the vote. Zeffen Hardin of San Antonio was the Republican nominee in the November 8 general election.

Primary results

General election

District 29

The incumbent, Democrat Gene Green, had represented the district since 1993. Green was challenged by Adrian Garcia and Dominique Garcia, but won the primary with 58% of the vote.

Julio Garza, and Robert Schafranek ran in the Republican primary, which Garza won with 59% of the vote.

Primary results

General election

District 30

The incumbent, Democrat Eddie Bernice Johnson, had represented the district since 1993. State Representative Barbara Mallory Caraway, who was a candidate for the seat in 2012 and 2014, challenged Johnson in the Democratic primary for a third time; Brandon J. Vance also ran in the primary. Johnson won with 69.42 percent of the vote. Republican Charles Lingerfelt was the Republican nominee.

Primary results

General election

District 31

The incumbent, Republican John Carter, had represented the district since 2003. He was challenged in the Republican primary by Mike Sweeney but won the primary with 71.28 percent of the vote.

Democrat Mike Clark was the Democratic nominee.

Primary results

General election

District 32

The incumbent, Republican Pete Sessions, had represented the district since 2003, and previously represented the 5th district from 1997 to 2003. Russ Ramsland and Paul Brown challenged Sessions for the Republican nomination, which Sessions won with 61 percent of the vote. No Democratic filed to run.

Primary results

General election

District 33

The incumbent, Democrat Marc Veasey, had represented the district since 2013. Marc Veasey was challenged in the Democratic primary by Carlos Quintanilla and won with 63 percent of the vote.

M. Mark Mitchell and Bruce Chadwick ran in the Republican primary, which Mitchell won with 52.39 percent of the vote.

Primary results

General election

District 34

The incumbent, Democrat Filemon Vela Jr., had represented the district since 2013. Republicans Rey Gonzalez Jr. and William "Willie" Vaden ran in the Republican primary, which Gonzalez won with 50.56 percent of the vote.

Primary results

General election

District 35

The incumbent, Democrat Lloyd Doggett, had represented the district since 2013. He was elected with 63% of the vote in 2014 and the district has a PVI of D+11. Republican Susan Narvaiz also ran for the district's seat.

Primary results

General election

District 36

The incumbent was Republican Brian Babin, who has represented the district since 2015, when Steve Stockman vacated the seat after a failed campaign for the United States Senate. He was elected with 76 percent of the vote in 2014. The district has a PVI of R+25.

Babin ran for re-election to a second term. Dwayne Stovall, a bridge construction contractor, school board member from Cleveland, and an unsuccessful candidate for the U.S. Senate in 2014 and the Texas House of Representatives in 2012, announced that he would challenge Babin for the Republican U.S. House nomination. Stovall, however, suspended his campaign in December 2015, leaving no Democrat to face Babin in the general election.

Primary results

General election

References

External links
U.S. House elections in Texas, 2016 at Ballotpedia
Campaign contributions at OpenSecrets

Texas
2016
House of Representatives